Mary, Mother of Jesus is a 1999 American made-for-television Biblical drama film that retells the story of Jesus through the eyes of Mary, his mother.

Plot
Although not recorded in the New Testament, the film emphasizes Mary's importance in Jesus' life by suggesting that his parables were inspired by stories Mary told him in his childhood  and portraying the resurrected Jesus appearing to Mary privately. The film closes with Mary suggesting that the disciples should start preaching about her son.

Production
The film stars Swedish actresses Pernilla August and Melinda Kinnaman as Mary, English actor David Threlfall as Joseph and British actor Christian Bale as Jesus. The film was produced by American Eunice Kennedy Shriver and aired on NBC.

Cast
 Christian Bale as Jesus of Nazareth
 Toby Bailiff as Young Jesus
 Pernilla August as Mary of Nazareth
 Melinda Kinnaman as Young Mary
 David Threlfall as Joseph of Nazareth
 Simone Bendix as Mary Magdalene
 Robert Addie as Pontius Pilate
 John Shrapnel as Simon
 Edward Hardwicke as Zechariah
 Hywel Bennett as Herod
 Geraldine Chaplin as Elizabeth
 Michael Mears as John
 Mark Jax as Peter
 Anna Mathias as Anne
 Crispian Belfrage as James the Great
 Christopher Routh as John the Baptist
 Andrew Grainger as Barrabas
 John Light as Archangel Gabriel
 David Schofield as Micah
 Iván Darvas as Silas
 Christopher Lawford as Reuben
 Judy Cornwell as Innkeeper's Wife
 Lajos Balázsovits as Chamberlin
 Zoltán Gera as Astrologer #1
 János Kulka as Melchior
 László Görög as Shepherd #2

See also

 List of American films of 1999
 List of films shot in Budapest
 1999 in American television

References

External links
 
 
 Film review in The New York Times

1999 drama films
1999 television films
1999 films
Films based on the Gospels
Films shot in Budapest
NBC network original films
Portrayals of Jesus in film
Portrayals of the Virgin Mary in film
Cultural depictions of John the Baptist
Films directed by Kevin Connor
Films scored by Ken Thorne
Portrayals of Mary Magdalene in film
Cultural depictions of Pontius Pilate
Depictions of Herod the Great on film